Nazir Tanbouli (born 1971) is an Egyptian born artist. He was born and raised in Alexandria, Egypt and studied at the University of Alexandria Faculty of Fine Arts. His uncle is the painter Ibrahim El-Tanbouli (b. 1954) and his great uncle was the painter and Egyptologist Lotfy El-Tanbouli (1919–1982). He works in drawing and painting, especially mural painting.

Biography
Born into a family of painters, including painter and Egyptologist Lotfy El Tanbouli Nazir Tanbouli was awarded the 1993 Grand Drawing Prize at the National Salon of Youth, Egypt and participated in Cairo Bienniale and many other exhibitions in Egypt and abroad. He spent a number of years exclusively in mural painting. In 2002 he moved to the United Kingdom. He lived for several years in Nottingham where he was an active artist and educator, and began to exhibit around Europe. In 2007 he moved to London where he lives and works.

In 2010 he completed an MA in Fine Art (Printmaking) at Camberwell College of Arts. He co-founded the artist-run space Studio 75, which creates projects and hosts exhibitions. Tanbouli has received significant awards from the Arts Council of England as well as private foundations, and his work is held in public collections in Egypt and a number of private collections in the UK. In 2012 he created the mural project THE KING'S LAND, covering a semi derelict East London housing estate with murals.

References

External links 
  http://www.hackneygazette.co.uk/news/massive_mural_brightens_up_haggerston_1_905067. Nazir Tanbouli mural in London May 2011.
  http://www.nottinghamvisualarts.net/artnot/events/jun19/257/nazir-tanbouli-talk-baptism-hailstones. Nazir Tanbouli artists talk at the Surface Gallery Nottingham 2009
  http://www.hackneygazette.co.uk/news/artist_wins_praise_for_haggerston_mural_1_775121. Tanbouli making the foundation of Studio 75 Haggerston, London
  https://web.archive.org/web/20120324140640/http://www.michaelforbes.org.uk/michael/essay_Eddie_Chambers.html. Tanbouli in exhibition "Next We Change Earth" at the New Art Exchange Nottingham 2009
  https://web.archive.org/web/20110822011222/http://miltonkeynes.com/constructed-mythologies-art-exhibition-until-6-july-2008.html.  Tanbouli mural exhibition Centre MK 2008
  http://www.culture24.org.uk/places+to+go/east+midlands/leicester/art30920. Tanbouli mural exhibition DeMontfort Hall Leicester 2005
  https://web.archive.org/web/20120324140640/http://www.julietgompertstrust.co.uk/artists/Tanbouli/CASOLE3.html. Tanbouli recipient of Juliet Gomperts Award 2006
  https://web.archive.org/web/20110404193811/http://weekly.ahram.org.eg/2000/466/cu1.htm. Tanbouli at Downtown Festival Cairo 2000
  http://www.nazirtanbouli.com. Nazir Tanbouli's website.
  Nazir Tanbouli interior mural in Dalston 2013
  Article in Cairo Scene about Nazir Tanbouli
  Nazir Tanbouli's work in animation music video by Spiritwo
  Nazir Tanbouli at Quozhappens 2013

Egyptian artists
Muralists
1971 births
Living people
People from Alexandria
Alexandria University alumni
Alumni of the University of the Arts London